Radio Baghdad may refer to:
Media in Iraq, where radio stations use the expression
"Radio Baghdad", a song by Patti Smith on her album Trampin'